

B
 BA   - Boston and Albany Railroad; New York Central Railroad; Penn Central; Conrail
 BADX - Baden Investment Company
 BAEX - Farmers Elevator Company of Bondurant, IA; The Andersons
 BALX - Bayer Corporation
 BANU - Bank Winter and Co Aktiengesellschaft
 BAP  - Butte, Anaconda and Pacific Railway
 BAPX - Bay Area Piggyback, Inc.
 BAR  - Bangor and Aroostook Railroad; Montreal, Maine and Atlantic Railway
 BARU - Barons Leasing Corporation
 BARZ - Bangor and Aroostook Railroad; Montreal, Maine and Atlantic Railway
 BASF - BASF
 BASX - Bay State Milling Company
 BAWX - Babcock & Wilcox Company
 BAYL - Bay Line Railroad
 BAYU - Mobay Chemical Corporation
 BAYX - Union Tank Car Company; Bayer Corporation
 BAZX - Bay Chemical Company, Inc.
 BB   - Buckingham Branch Railroad
 BBCX - BBC Brown Boveri, Inc.; ABB Power Generation, Inc.
 BBRX - Bombardier Inc. (Transportation Equipment Group)
 BBSZ - Barbar Steamship Lines, Inc.
 BBTU - Bress Bulk International Bulk Transport and Consulting
 BCAX - Blue Circle, Inc.
 BCCX - Border Chemical Company
 BCDX - Borden Chemical (a division of Borden, Inc.)
 BCE  - British Columbia Hydro and Power Authority
 BCFX - GE Railcar Services Corporation
 BCGX - Bay Cities Gas Corporation
 BCH  - British Columbia Hydro and Power Authority; Southern Railway of British Columbia
 BCIT - British Columbia Railway; Canadian National Railway
 BCIU - Bay Cities Leasing Company
 BCIX - Blue Circle, Inc.
 BCJU - Bay Cities Leasing Company
 BCK  - Buffalo Creek Railroad; Conrail
 BCER - British Columbia Electric Railway
 BCLR - Bay Colony Railroad
 BCLU - Bibby Bros. Company
 BCMX - Bullet Concrete Materials Company
 BCNE - Canadian National Railway
 BCOL - British Columbia Railway; Canadian National
 BCPX - Brighton Corporation
 BCRR - Boyne City Railroad
 BCRX - GE Capital Rail Services
 BCRY - Barrie-Collingwood Railway
 BCTX - Boise Cascade
 BCTZ - Boise Cascade
 BCVX - West Coast Express
 BCWX - Union Tank Car Company
 BCYU - Bay Cities Leasing Company; Union Pacific
 BDCX - Anchor Glass Container
 BDLX - BDL Company
 BDMX - Blue Diamond Mining, Inc.
 BDNX - Baroid Division, NL Industries, Inc.; Baroid Drilling Fluids, Inc.
 BDRV - Belvidere and Delaware River Railway
 BDTL - Ballard Terminal Railroad
 BDW  - Bighorn Divide and Wyoming Railroad
 BE   - Baltimore and Eastern Railroad; Conrail
 BECX - FMC Corporation (Inorganic Chemicals Division)
 BEEM - Beech Mountain Railroad
 BEKR - Berks Rail Corporation
 BELX - Bell Processing, Inc.
 BENX - Bennett Lumber Products, Inc.; Investors Property Service
 BEPX - Coastal States Energy Company
 BFC  - Bellefonte Central Railroad
 BFCF - Bremerton Freight Car Ferry
 BFCX - Berwick Freight Car Company
 BFFX - Berwick Forge and Fabrication Division Whittaker Corporation
 BFGX - B. F. Goodrich Company (Chemical Group); Oxy Vinyls, LP
 BFHU - Bailee Freight Services, Ltd.
 BFIX - Bethlehem Steel Corporation
 BFJR - Brillion and Forest Junction Railroad
 BFPX - Besse Forest Products
 BFRX - Bakery Trading Company
 BFSU - Bailee Freight Services, Ltd.
 BFTX - Bill Frank Rail Service
 BGCM - Bountiful Grain and Craig Mountain Railroad
 BGEX - General American Marks Company
 BGFX - Barnabas Group Foundation
 BGKU - Schering AG
 BGSX - Strata Corporation
 BH   - Bath and Hammondsport Railroad; B and H Rail Corporation
 BHCR - Black Hills Central Railroad
 BHCU - Bridgehead Container Service
 BHP  - BHP Nevada Railroad
 BHTX - Bernhart Crane and Rigging Company
 BHWY - Boot Hill and Western Railway
 BIAX - Ocala Recycling
 BICX - Beker Industries Corporation
 BIDU - Universal Bulk-Handling, Ltd.
 BIGX - Big Three Industries, Inc.; Air Liquide America Corporation
 BIRR - Bellingham International Railroad
 BISX - Brandenburg Industrial Service Company
 BITY - Penn Eastern Rail Lines, Inc.
 BJGX - BJ Gas Supply, Inc.
 BJHX - B. J. Hughes, Inc.; BJ Titan Services Company
 BJOX - Citicorp Railmark Inc. (Citirail)
 BJRY - Burlington Junction Railway
 BKLU - Bank Line Limited
 BKRR - Batten Kill Railroad
 BKRU - Baker Tanks
 BKTY - Missouri-Kansas-Texas Railroad; Union Pacific
 BLA  - Baltimore and Annapolis Railroad
 BLCX - The Commonwealth Plan, Inc.
 BLE  - Bessemer and Lake Erie Railroad
 BLHX - SMBC Rail Services
 BLKM - Black Mesa & Lake Powell Railroad
 BLKU - Bulkhaul Company
 BLKZ - Mid-American Intermodal Equipment Corporation
 BLMR - Blue Mountain Railroad
 BLOL - Bloomer Line
 BLU  - Blue Ridge Southern Railroad
 BM   - Boston and Maine Railroad; Pan Am Railways
 BMAZ - Better Asset Management; Transamerica Leasing
 BMCX - Bluewater Michigan Chapter, Inc.
 BMDX - GE Railcar Services Corporation
 BMDZ - Minnesota, Dakota and Western Railway
 BMEX - Brookville Equipment Corporation
 BMH  - Beaufort and Morehead Railroad
 BMIZ - Burlington Motor Carriers
 BML  - Belfast and Moosehead Lake Railroad
 BMRG - Blue Mountain and Reading Railroad
 BMS  - Berlin Mills Railway; St. Lawrence and Atlantic Railroad
 BMSX - Bemis Company, Inc.
 BMT  - Brooklyn–Manhattan Transit
 BMZ  - Boston and Maine Railroad; Pan Am Railways
 BN   - Burlington Northern Railroad; Burlington Northern and Santa Fe Railway; BNSF Railway
 BNAU - Burlington Northern and Santa Fe Railway; BNSF Railway
 BNAZ - Burlington Northern and Santa Fe Railway; BNSF Railway
 BNFE - Burlington Northern Railroad; Burlington Northern and Santa Fe Railway; BNSF Railway
 BNFT - Burlington Northern Railroad; Burlington Northern and Santa Fe Railway; BNSF Railway
 BNGR - Blackwell Northern Gateway Railroad
 BNIU - British and Irish Steam Packet Company
 BNML - Burlington Northern (Manitoba), Ltd.
 BNO  - Burlington Northern and Santa Fe Railway; BNSF Railway
 BNOW - Burlington Northern (Oregon-Washington), Inc.
 BNPZ - Pacific Rail Services
 BNQ  - Burlington Northern Railroad; Burlington Northern and Santa Fe Railway; BNSF Railway End Of Train Devices
 BNRQ - Burlington Northern and Santa Fe Railway; BNSF Railway
 BNRZ - Burlington Northern and Santa Fe Railway; BNSF Railway
 BNSF - Burlington Northern and Santa Fe Railway; BNSF Railway
 BNXU - Burlington Northern and Santa Fe Railway; BNSF Railway
 BNZ  - Burlington Northern and Santa Fe Railway; BNSF Railway
 BO   - Baltimore and Ohio Railroad; Chessie System; CSX Transportation
 BOBX - Freeman Gas of N.C., Inc.
 BOCT - Baltimore and Ohio Chicago Terminal Railroad; CSX Transportation
 BOCX - BOC Gases
 BOCY - Boat Company
 BOGU - BSL Transport
 BOMX - Baltimore and Ohio Railroad Museum
 BONU - Bond International, Ltd.
 BOP  - Border Pacific Railroad
 BORX - US Borax, Inc.
 BORZ - Ecorail, Inc.
 BOSU - W. BOS Vloeistof Transport, B.V.
 BOZ  - CSX Transportation
 BPAX - United States Department of Energy (Bonneville Power Administration)
 BPAZ - Acme Markets, Inc.
 BPCU - BP Chemicals Belgium
 BPCX - Basin Electric Power Cooperative
 BPIX - Nova Chemicals, Inc.
 BPLU - M1 Engineering, Ltd.
 BPLX - Nova Chemicals, Inc.
 BPOX - BP Amoco Chemical Company (BP Oil Division)
 BPPX - Brewster Phosphates of Bradley, Florida; General American Marks Company
 BPRC - Bergen Passaic Railway Corporation 
 BPRR - Buffalo and Pittsburgh Railroad
 BPRX - Bergen Passaic Railway Corporation
 BPTR - Bergen Passaic Terminal Railroad
 BR   - Bradford Industrial Rail
 BRAN - Brandon Corporation
 BRAX - Brae Corporation; CIT Equipment Finance Corporation
 BRBX - Bombardier Transportation
 BRC  - Belt Railway of Chicago
 BRCX - Bunge North America, Inc.
 BRCY - Cando Contracting, Ltd.
 BRE  - Burlington Northern Railroad
 BREX - Big Rivers Electric Corporation
 BRG  - Brownsville and Rio Grande International Railroad
 BRIX - Incobrasa Industries; Union Tank Car Company
 BRKX - Burke Energy Corporation
 BRLX - BRS Leasing Company
 BRNU - Brun, SA
 BRNZ - Comtrak
 BROU - Swedish Transocean Lines
 BRR  - Battle River Railroad (formerly used by Belton Railroad)
 BRRC - Borinstein Railroad
 BRRX - Brooklyn Resource Recovery, Inc.
 BRSR - Blue Ridge Scenic Railway
 BRW  - Black River and Western
 BS   - Birmingham Southern Railroad
 BSCX - Bethlehem Steel Corporation
 BSDA - BSDA Railroad
 BSIX - Bethlehem Steel Corporation
 BSLU - Blue Star Line, Ltd.
 BSMX - Bay State Milling Company
 BSOR - Buffalo Southern Railroad
 BSPX - Otter Tail Power Company
 BSR - Big Spring Rail
 BSRR - Branford Steam Railroad
 BSRX - Branson Scenic Railway
 BST  - Bi-State Transit; MetroLink
 BSTX - Trinitas Corporation
 BSVY - Boone and Scenic Valley Railroad
 BTAX - Big Three Lincoln-Alaska, Inc.; Air Liquide America Corporation
 BTC  - Birmingham Terminal
 BTCO - Boston Terminal Company
 BTCU - Bulkmatic Transport Company
 BTCZ - Bulkmatic Transport Company
 BTEX - BTE Equipment
 BTLZ - Intermodal Services, Inc.
 BTRX - Rocky Mountain Transportation Services
 BTTX - Trailer Train Company; TTX Corporation
 BUDX - Budd Company
 BUDZ - Bud Antle
 BUGX - Bruggere and Monson
 BUKX - Louisville Gas and Electric Company
 BUNX - The Buncher Company
 BUNZ - Burnside International Trucks
 BVCX - West Coast Express
 BVHX - BV Heddrick Gravel and Sand Company
 BVRY - Brandywine Valley Railroad
 BVS  - Bevier and Southern Railroad
 BWC  - Berwind Corporation; Pennsylvania Railroad; Penn Central; Conrail
 BWCX - Borg-Warner Chemicals; GE Plastics
 BXBX - BXB Corporation
 BXN  - Bauxite and Northern Railway
 BYCX - Battle Ground Yacolt and Chelatchie Prairie Railroad

References 

B